Castaway is an Australian children's television series that premiered in Australia on the Seven Network on 12 February 2011. The series is a sequel to the 2008 series Trapped. It was delayed from its initial premiere date in 2010 and as a result first aired on Swedish television, premiering on 1 November 2010 and ending on 6 December 2010.

Reviews
Youth Television News reviewed the series positively, with the comment "a higher quality of acting, cameras, filming locations and writing, overshadows the previous series in a good way".

Cast 
 Benjamin Jay as Ryan Cavaner
 Maia Mitchell as Natasha Hamilton
 Anthony Spanos as Josh Jacobs
 Mikayla Southgate as Jarrah Haddon
 Joshua Hibble as Zuke Haddon
 Natasha Phillips as Lily Taylor
 Matilda Terbio as Emma Taylor
 Brad Albert as Gabe Schwartz
 Tara Bilston as Saskia
 Sarah Mills as Dionne
 Lincoln Hall as Eli Fox
 Mukundan Jr as Dr. Hamilton
 Community Group - Luisa Mitchell, Chelsea Albert, Logan Deily

Episodes

See also
 Trapped (Australian TV series)
 List of Australian television series

References

External links

Australian children's television series
Seven Network original programming
2010 Australian television series debuts